Botman is a surname. Notable people with the surname include: 

Selma Botman (born 1950), American academic
Sven Botman (born 2000), Dutch footballer
Thembile Botman (born 1976), South African actor and businessman

See also
Bowman (surname)